This is a list of the National Register of Historic Places listings in Cape Cod National Seashore.

This is intended to be a complete list of the properties and districts on the National Register of Historic Places in Cape Cod National Seashore, Massachusetts, United States.  The locations of National Register properties and districts for which the latitude and longitude coordinates are included below, may be seen in a Google map.

There are 25 properties and districts listed on the National Register in the park, one of which is a National Historic Landmark.

Current listings 

|}

See also 
 National Register of Historic Places listings in Barnstable County, Massachusetts
 List of National Historic Landmarks in Massachusetts
 National Register of Historic Places listings in Massachusetts

References

External links

Cape Cod National Seashore